Raymond Shane Dye (born 26 September 1966, in the township of Matamata New Zealand), is a former jockey. He was an apprentice jockey to Dave O’Sullivan at Matamata, before moving to Sydney, Australia initially working with Vic Thompson at Warwick Farm in the late-1980s. In a distinguished riding career, Dye won the Melbourne Cup on Tawriffic in 1989 in then-record time, and won four consecutive Golden Slippers from 1989 to 1992. He also won the Cox Plate on Octagonal in 1995.

Dye rode in Mauritius after eight years in Hong Kong.

Dye has not ridden in competitive racing since 2013 and has said he will not return to racing. On 9 March 2014 he was inducted into the Australian Racing Hall of Fame.

Notable wins
 
The following are some of the races Shane has won in his career.

See also

 Thoroughbred racing in Australia
 Thoroughbred racing in New Zealand

References

1966 births
Living people
New Zealand jockeys
Australian jockeys
Australian Thoroughbred Racing Hall of Fame inductees
New Zealand Racing Hall of Fame inductees
People from Matamata
Sportspeople from Waikato